Pilisthe Palukutha is a divine romantic film directed in Telugu by Kodi Ramakrishna and produced by Sajjala Srinivas. Music and background score by M.M. Keeravani. The film stars Akash, Shamita Shetty, Vijay Chandar, Chandra Mohan, Dharmavarapu Subramanyam and Sunil. The film was released under the banner of Radha Chitra on 18 October 2002.

Plot 
Pilisthe Palukutha is a religious romantic Telugu film, which talks about the life in college of students Akash, Sunil & Shamita Shetty and the love between Akash and Shamita Shetty. Suddenly Shamita's life takes a turn due to a brain tumor and believes Sai Baba can save her from dying, which he does along with converting all the non-believers into his devoted devotees.

Akash, Shamita and Sunil are the students of the college.

Vijay Chander, plays the role of Shirdi Sai Baba whose divine help is sought by the young lovers (Akash and Shamita Shetty).

Dharmavarapu Subrahmanyam plays a devoted and lovable principal.

Chandra Mohan has an equally important role as a beggar and is connected with the love story between the hero and heroine.

Cast 
 Akash as Ajay
 Shamita Shetty as Shanti
 Vijayachander as Sai Baba
 Sunil
 Dharmavarapu Subramanyam as College Principal
 M. S. Narayana
 L. B. Sriram
 Chandra Mohan as Nana
 Sudeepa Pinky as Shanti's sister

Music 
Keeravani's music, feel the makers, will be a major asset. He came up with a combination of soulful and youthful music, which is bound to be top of the charts. The seven-minute song on Baba is a highlight. The songs are sung by SP Balasubrahmanyam, Chitra, Karthik, MM Keeravani, Kulasekhar.

Release 
The film was released on 3 January 2003 under the banner of Radha Chitra.

References

External links 
 http://uservideos.smashits.com/video/lBdu7QZcxSs/Pilisthe-Palukutha-Songs-Manasa-Ottu-Aakash-Shamitha-Shetty.html

2003 films
Films directed by Kodi Ramakrishna
Films scored by M. M. Keeravani
Hindu devotional films
2000s Telugu-language films